SV Spittal/Drau is an Austrian association football club, based in Spittal an der Drau, Carinthia. The club founded in 1921 was promoted to the First League (II) in 1982 and won the championship of the 1983–84 season, however playing in the Bundesliga only until its immediate relegation in 1985. Spittal then became a long-term member of the First League until in 1999 the team slipped to the Austrian Regional League Central. In the 2008–09 season they finished 16th continuing their way down to the Kärntner Liga.

Current squad

Staff and board members

 Vice Chairman:  Markus Unterguggenberger
 Treasurer:  Horst Kleinfercher
 Secretary :  Martina Altersberger
 Deputy Treasurer:  Walter Egger

External links
  Official Website

 
Association football clubs established in 1921
Spittal Drau,SV
1921 establishments in Austria